The mainline passenger locomotives, later classified as B class, ran on the Victorian Railways (VR) between 1862 and 1917. They used a  wheel arrangement, which provided greater traction on the new, more heavily graded Geelong–Ballarat railway and the Melbourne-Bendigo-Echuca railway, as opposed to the 2-2-2 arrangement previously selected for the relatively level Geelong line. The B class locomotives are regarded as the first mainline VR motive power, and were highly successful in passenger operations.

History
The Victorian Railways was formed after the government had taken over the struggling Melbourne, Mount Alexander and Murray River Railway Company in 1856 and the Geelong and Melbourne Railway Company line in 1860. The new organisation began the construction of two main lines to serve the booming gold-mining towns of Ballarat, Castlemaine and Sandhurst (Bendigo), as well as tap the lucrative Murray River trade at Echuca. Those ambitious new railway projects, engineered to a very high, and very expensive, standard, traversed some difficult terrain, which featured numerous gradients of up to 1 in 50. The 2-2-2 passenger locomotives the VR had used to operate the relatively flat Geelong line proved unsuitable for heavier grades, and the VR fleet was also stretched in serving the needs of its rapidly expanding network.

New locomotives were ordered from R and W Hawthorn in Newcastle upon Tyne, England in February 1861, with a layout very similar to that of a successful  design previously built for the Great Northern Railway in England, but with modifications such as the fitting of cabs and steam domes.

Production
The initial order of seven  locomotives was followed by another order of seven of the same type from Beyer, Peacock and Company in April 1862, and there were two further orders of six locomotives from each manufacturer in October and the following January.

None of the locomotives had arrived in time for the opening of the Geelong to Ballarat line in April 1862, and passenger services on the line had to be worked by suburban saddle tank locomotives (later designated as L class) until the arrival of the first of the new main line locomotives in July 1862.

The success of the  mainline locomotives was such that, despite ongoing advances in locomotive technology, the design continued to be built. A further order of six locomotives was placed with Beyer Peacock in 1871, and a two were built by the Phoenix Foundry of Ballarat in 1880.

The locomotives were initially unclassed, and were numbered according to the initial scheme, in which odd numbers were used for goods locomotives and even numbers for passenger locomotives, before being denoted as "B class" under the VR's 1889 reclassification. By that time, a new 4-4-0 express passenger locomotive had been introduced, which took the "A class" designation.

Design features
The B-class locomotives were easily recognisable by their use of external frames and bearings, with coupling rods mounted outside the frames, earning them the nickname "overarmers".

They featured an unusual design of firebox, which had two separate chambers, each with its own firedoor, divided by a water space that effectively acted as a thermic syphon, and joined at the tubeplate. The two fireboxes were designed to be worked separately, with one fire being built while the other was burning. That configuration was designed to extract the maximum heat from the wood fuels the VR used in its early years. However, the last two locomotives, built in the 1880s, had a conventional single firebox.

Service Life

The B class's initial duties, hauling passenger services on the new mainlines, expanded as the mainline network grew. B 88 had the honour of leading the first VR train to Albury on 14 June 1883.

B 50 was selected to haul the first Victorian Railways Royal Train in 1867, taking Prince Alfred Duke of Edinburgh to Ballarat, Bendigo and Castlemaine.

By 1894, the VR's Rolling Stock Branch Diagram Book noted the allocation of B-class locomotives around the state, with two at Stawell, six at Melbourne, five at Bendigo, three at Geelong, six at Ballarat, four at Benalla, and three at Seymour.

While the B-class locomotives were highly successful on the expensively engineered 1860s mainlines for which they were designed, they were less suited for the more cheaply built extensions to the VR system. Future VR express passenger locomotives were to use a four-wheel leading bogie to steer the locomotive, and from 1884, a class of 4-4-0 locomotives (later classed 'Old A') began to supplement, and eventually supersede the B class. Despite the delivery of the Old A, and the later and increasingly larger 'New A' and AA class 4-4-0s of 1889 and 1900 respectively, the entire B class (other than a couple of accident write-offs) lasted into the 20th century, with their roles ranging from double heading on express passenger trains to shunting duties.

Design improvements
Given their long life and the considerable technological development of railways during that period, the B-class locomotives saw a number of improvements.

As delivered, the only means of braking them was by operating a handbrake on the tender wheels. B 50 and B 108 were used in comparative trials of the Woods hydraulic and Westinghouse air brake systems in January 1884, leading to the Westinghouse system being adopted as the standard.

Those changes led to considerably increased tractive effort.

The large spark-arresting chimneys originally fitted were replaced by a straight chimney, with a conical spark arrestor being located in the smokebox.

The cab was also redesigned to provide greater amenity to the crew. The original sheet metal structure, prone to vibration at speed, was replaced by one of wood, and a double roof was employed for greater comfort in Australian weather conditions.

Accidents
B 82 and B 92 were wrecked beyond repair in a head-on collision on the Geelong line between Little River and Werribee on 2 April 1884. On 18 August of the same year, B 72's boiler exploded at Warrenheip, although that locomotive was repaired and returned to service.

B 110 was involved in a spectacular mishap on 13 April 1904 when it pushed a rake of coal wagons off the end of the coal stage at Seymour and was left suspended by its tender, resting on the wreckage of the wagons below.

Withdrawal and scrapping
Other than accident write-offs, the entire class lasted until 1904, when ten were withdrawn, many of which were over forty years old by that stage. Over the next ten years, the remainder of the class was gradually retired as mechanical condition dictated, to the point where just two locomotives, B 56 and B 76, remained on the register.

Those last two members of the class served out their final days shunting carriages at Spencer Street Station and North Melbourne yards, and were withdrawn for scrapping in May and June 1917.

None were preserved.

References

External links 
 VPRS 12903/H 1177 B, O and L class locomotive at Spencer Street locomotive sheds, with B 50 decorated for hauling the Royal Train
 VPRS 12903/P1 Box 299/08 Drawing of B class steam locomotive

2-4-0 locomotives
B class 
Beyer, Peacock locomotives
Railway locomotives introduced in 1862
Broad gauge locomotives in Australia
Scrapped locomotives